Paier College (formerly Paier College of Art) is a private for-profit art college in Bridgeport, Connecticut. Previously located in Hamden, Connecticut, Paier is the only independent art college in Connecticut.

History 
In 1946, Paier was established by Edward T. and Adele K. Paier as the Paier School of Applied Arts in West Haven, Connecticut. Paier absorbed students from the Whitney School of Art when it closed, leading to the new title Paier School of Art. Paier moved to New Haven in 1954 and then finally to 6 Prospect Court in Hamden in 1960 and in 1963 expanded to its present location. In 1982, Paier was accredited as a 4-year degree-granting college. In 2019, the Paier College of Art named Joseph Bierbaum, former president of Stone Academy, as its new president to succeed former president Jonathan Paier. In March 2021, Paier announced a name change from Paier College of Art to Paier College and plans to move its campus to Bridgeport, Connecticut, into facilities formerly used by the University of Bridgeport, before the start of the fall 2021 semester.

Academics 
Paier College of Art focuses on training students for technical and professional careers as artists.  Paier offers five Bachelor of Fine Arts (BFA) degree programs as well as four certificates and one Associate degree. The college also offers part-time and evening classes, continuing education, and electives in general education and liberal arts.

Accreditation 
Paier College of Art is licensed by the Connecticut Board of Governors of Higher Education and is accredited by the Accrediting Commission of Career Schools and Colleges. It was also previously a member of the International Council of Design Schools.

Campus 
Located in a suburban neighborhood, Paier's campus is composed of four buildings and maintains relationships with local student housing options in the surrounding community. Paier is situated just north of New Haven (pop. 124,000) and numerous cultural resources like Yale's Art Gallery, museums, libraries and theaters. Paier is within commuting distance to Hartford (38 miles), New York City (78 miles), and Boston (154 miles) by car, bus, or train.

Galleries and events
Paier has a student gallery and a faculty gallery. The campus hosts annual Winter and Spring Art Shows, sales as well as a Fall Paier Picnic.

Notable alumni 
Paier College of Art has graduated successful artists including:

Romas Kukalis, Canadian-American artist
Vance A. Larson, painter
Don Maitz, science fiction/fantasy artist
Tim O’Brien, who has drawn covers for Time Magazine, GQ and Rolling Stone
Howard Porter of DC Comics and Marvel Comics
Joseph Reboli, painter
Ruth Sanderson, book cover illustrator
Walter Wick, co-creator of the I Spy series
George Wildman, cartoonist

References

External links 
Official website

Buildings and structures in Hamden, Connecticut
Private universities and colleges in Connecticut
Art schools in Connecticut
Design schools in the United States
Educational institutions established in 1946
Universities and colleges in New Haven County, Connecticut
1946 establishments in Connecticut